Acraea aglaonice, the clear-spotted acraea, is a butterfly of the family Nymphalidae. It is found in KwaZulu-Natal, Mozambique, Transvaal, Zimbabwe and Botswana.

Description

The wingspan is 43–49 mm for males and 45–55 mm for females.
A. aglaonice Westw. Both wings above red-yellow nearly to the base with the usual black dots; the discal dots of the hindwing, however, are smaller than usual and discal dots 3 to 6 on the forewing are normally placed far beyond the apex of the cell, opposite to the origin of vein 10; the fore wing above without definite dark apical spot, only with narrow black marginal line as at the costal and distal margins; veins at the distal margin black; hindwing above with black, unspotted marginal band 2 to 3 mm. in breadth; wings beneath lighter, hindwing at the base with red spots and in the marginal band with streak-like whitish marginal spots. It is peculiar to this species that the forewing has nearly always in cellules 4 and 5 (and 6) small hyaline spots, just distally to the discal dots; in the female these spots are often whitish instead of hyaline. Natal; Transvaal; Mashonaland; Manicaland; Delagoa Bay. -ab. albofasciata ab. nov. Fore wing in the basal third blackish, in the middle black-grey and more or less transparent whitish, before the distal margin for a breadth of about 5 mm. grey-yellow with black veins; at the apex black for about 3 mm.; black marginal band only 1 mm. in breadth. Hindwing above black with a white median band 7 mm. in breadth, which encloses the comparatively large discal dots. Under surface light grey-yellow with yellow streaks on the interneural folds; forewing only with very fine black marginal line; hindwing with marginal band 2 mm. in breadth, enclosing large semicircular 
whitish marginal spots. Manicaland. Should probably be regarded as an extreme rainy-season form.

Biology
Adults are on wing year round, with peaks in early summer and autumn. There are multiple generations per year.
The larvae feed on Passiflora edulis and Passiflora incarnata.

Taxonomy
Acraea caecilia species group
See also Pierre & Bernaud, 2014

References

External links

Die Gross-Schmetterlinge der Erde 13: Die Afrikanischen Tagfalter. Plate XIII 55 d
Acraea aglaonice Le Site des Acraea de Dominique Bernaud
Acraea aglaonice Image collection Dominique Bernaud
Images representing Acraea aglaonice at Bold

aglaonice
Butterflies described in 1881
Butterflies of Africa
Taxa named by John O. Westwood